Mohammad Azim is a first-class and List A cricketer from Bangladesh. He made his debut for Dhaka Division in 2006/07 and impressed with 5 for 54 against Dhaka Division.

References

Bangladeshi cricketers
Dhaka Division cricketers
Living people
Year of birth missing (living people)
Barisal Division cricketers
Dhaka Metropolis cricketers
Partex Sporting Club cricketers
Prime Bank Cricket Club cricketers